Gourmet Girl Graffiti, known in Japan as , is a four-panel comic strip manga written and illustrated by Makoto Kawai. It was serialized in Houbunsha's Manga Time Kirara Miracle! magazine between the March 2012 and November 2016 issues. A 12-episode anime television series adaptation by Shaft aired between January and March 2015.

Plot
Ryō Machiko is a second-year middle school girl who has been living by herself since her grandmother died. Despite having exceptional skill in cooking, Ryō has felt her cooking hasn't been tasting good. That is, until she meets her second cousin, Kirin Morino, who comes to stay with her on the weekends to attend cram school in Tokyo and shows her the key to great tasting food: eating together with friends and family.

Characters

Ryō is the protagonist of the series and is a second-year middle school student of Hariyama Middle School who lives by herself in a big apartment. Her parents live abroad due to their work, and she was brought up by her grandmother, who died a year before the story begins. Her wish is to pass the entrance examination of a high school specializing in art, and therefore she goes to an art cram school, where she gets to know Shiina. As the story progresses, she enters her desired high school, where she becomes classmates with Kirin and Shiina. Ryō is a talented cook and is capable of cooking a wide range of dishes. After Hariyama Middle School school graduation, she went to Hariyama High School.

Kirin is a girl who is the same age as Ryō and is her second cousin despite her short stature and looking like a twelve-year old. She hopes to go to an art school in Tokyo, so she attends the same art cram school as Ryō every Sunday and stays at Ryō's house every Saturday the day before. She is shy and has a somewhat childish side, but is extremely polite and well-mannered. She is short, but contrary to her appearance, is a powerful child and is a big eater. She has an unrivaled athletic ability among the characters in the series. She is bad at housework, but somewhat knowledgeable about cooking. She later attends the same high school as Shiina and Ryō and moves into Ryō's apartment to attend school. Kirin joins the basketball club in high school and is called "Kii" by her friends and teammates. She expresses her thoughts on food dynamically. She does not like carrots. After middle school graduation, she went to same high school as Ryo. At the end of the television series, Kirin moved in Ryō's home to live with her.

Shiina is Ryō's friend from middle school. She is one of the students of the art prep school both Ryō and Kirin also attend and lives with an old family in the metropolitan area. She is physically fragile, but is a beautiful young lady who is cool and has mysterious atmosphere. She meets Ryō because they are in the same class together, and she knows Kirin from flower viewing in the park. She is accepted to the same high school as Ryō and Kirin. Thanks to her cooking skill, she builds up a circle of friends besides Kirin and Ryō. After middle school graduation, she went to same high school as Ryo.

A woman who lives below Ryō in her apartment complex. Her favourite food is pizza. After her meeting with Ryo and Kirin in Yuki's home, Yuki attended the high school where Ryo, Kirin, Hina, Mei would later attend.

Ryō's aunt. Always business at work, she rarely visits Ryo. During break from work, she is frequently seen drinking beer.

Shiina's maid and housekeeper who dresses like a shrine maiden. She was mistaken by Kirin as Shiina's mother after she gave her a tomato. She is the only character in the series that doesn't talk much.

A classmate of Ryo and Kirin from prep school, and from the same middle school as Ryo. She has shoulder length blonde hair. After middle school graduation, she went to same high school as Ryo.

A classmate of Ryo and Kirin from prep school, and from the same middle school as Ryo. She has dark brown hair and wears a white headband. After middle school graduation, she went to same high school as Ryo.

Another classmate of Ryo and Kirin from cram school. She has a spoiled and annoying personality and has silver white hair worn in a ponytail.

Ryō's grandmother who died a year prior to the start of the story. She is the one who taught Ryō all about cooking, although it is later revealed she was once terrible at cooking and only started taking it seriously for Ryō's sake.

A librarian who is an old friend of Ryō and her grandmother. She also introduced cookbooks to Ryo's Grandma when she needed to learn cooking, and the same cookbooks were introduced to Ryō when Ryō lived alone.

A short brown-haired girl from the same middle school as Mei, Hina, Ryō.

A sweet childish young woman. Because of her young appearance she strongly resembles a teenager.

 

Kirin's strict and temperamental mother and Ryo's aunt. She is bossy to both her daughter and husband and often argue's a lot with Kirin, but does care about her as a parent.

Kirin's calm and loving father. He has an eccentric personality.

Ryo's mother. She works overseas with Ryo's father for an unknown secret job, but occasionally mailing Japan-made food to Ryo. In the television series, she is only seen in Ryo's dream sequence.

Media

Manga
The original four-panel comic strip manga, written and illustrated by Makoto Kawai, was serialized in Houbunsha's Manga Time Kirara Miracle! magazine between the March 2012 and November 2016 issues. Houbunsha published seven tankōbon volumes from January 26, 2013 to September 27, 2016.

Anime
A 12-episode anime television series adaptation, produced by Shaft, directed by Naoyuki Tatsuwa, and chief directed by Akiyuki Shinbo aired in Japan between January 9 and March 27, 2015 and was simulcast by Crunchyroll. The screenplay is by Mari Okada and the music was composed by Kotringo. Kazuya Shiotsuki (Shaft) designed the characters for animation, and served as chief animation director alongside Shinya Nishizawa and Takumi Yokota. Three episodes were outsourced: episode 4 to Mouse; episode 7 to Jumondou; and episode 11 to Drop. Sentai Filmworks licensed the anime in North America.

Video game
Characters from the series appear alongside other Manga Time Kirara characters in the mobile RPG, Kirara Fantasia in 2020.

Notes

References

External links
 Anime official website at TBS 
 

2012 manga
Anime series based on manga
Comedy anime and manga
Cooking in anime and manga
Houbunsha manga
Seinen manga
Sentai Filmworks
Slice of life anime and manga
Shaft (company)
TBS Television (Japan) original programming
Television shows written by Mari Okada
Yonkoma